The first season of the American competitive reality television series Next Level Chef premiered on Fox on January 2, 2022, and concluded on March 2, 2022. Gordon Ramsay hosted the season and served as a mentor, along with mentors Nyesha Arrington and Richard Blais.

The season was won by social media chef Stephanie "Pyet" Despain, with professional chef Mariah Scott and professional chef Reuel Vincent finishing as co-runners-up.

Production
The series was first ordered on May 17, 2021. On October 19, 2021, it was announced that the season would premiere on January 2, 2022, before moving to its regular timeslot on January 5, 2022. A new episode was also aired on January 30, following the NFC Championship Game between the Los Angeles Rams and the San Francisco 49ers.

Chefs

Elimination table

†The contestant cooked the best dish overall and won safety for their team or themselves.

Episodes

Ratings

Notes

References

2022 American television seasons
Next Level Chef